Fritz von Runte is a British DJ and Producer based in Manchester, England. He is most known for his work remixing other artists, particularly with work such as The Beatles Hell and The Beatles Hate, Lily Allen Remixed (reputed to be the most downloaded album in the UK) and Bowie 2001, which incorporates samples from Stanley Kubrick's 2001 in the remixing of David Bowie's catalogue. He is also known for a series of mashups titled Lycantropii, begun in 2003. In 2020 Fritz released the first new original album of songs after 11 years. It features Leslie Winer, Beca, Peter Barakan and long time collaborators Graham Massey and Gary Asquith.

Fritz von Runte works with the American record label 24 Hour Service Station, and releases his own material under the anti-war non-profit label Marshall Records. He regularly remixes for the self-produced Winterhits series.

Discography

Albums

EP

Winterhits Mixes

Miscellaneous Singles & Remixes

References

External links 
 fritz.vonrunte.com

British DJs
Living people
24 Hour Service Station artists
Year of birth missing (living people)